The Afghanistan Cricket Board (ACB; , ; formerly Afghanistan Cricket Federation) is the official governing body of cricket in the Afghanistan. It is Afghanistan's representative at the International Cricket Council (ICC) and was an associate member of ICC from June 2013 until becoming a full member in June 2017. Before that it was an affiliate member and has been a member of that body since 2001. It is also a member of the Asian Cricket Council.

In August 2021, Taliban leaders arrived to the ACB headquarter accompanied by former Afghan national cricketer Abdullah Mazari. and ordered the cricket board to carry on the activities as usual.

History
Cricket in Afghanistan was first played during the 19th century Anglo-Afghan Wars, with British troops reported as having played in Kabul in 1839. However, unlike many countries, no lasting cricket legacy was left by the British, and it would be more than a hundred years before cricket returned.

In the 1990s, cricket became popular amongst Afghan refugees in Pakistan, and the Afghanistan Cricket Federation was formed there in 1995. They continued to play cricket on their return to their home country in late 2001. Like all sports, cricket was originally banned by the ruling Taliban, but it became a notable exception in 2000 and the Afghanistan Cricket Federation was elected as an affiliate member of the ICC the following year.

The Afghanistan national cricket team's 21-run win over Namibia in Krugersdorp earned them official One Day International status in April 2009. The team qualified for the 2012 ICC Under-19 Cricket World Cup.

On 11 November 2010, the Afghan national women's cricket team was formed. This was to help females understand the game of cricket and have a parallel team to that of the men. Also policy states that as per Islamic tradition women can optionally wear a headscarf or hijab which is their own choice.

In July 2016, ACB unveiled a strategic plan and set targets for Afghanistan to be a top-six ODI team by 2019 and a top-three team in both T20Is and ODIs by 2025. In order to achieve this, ACB created a proposal to be presented to BCCI, in the works to secure annual bilateral matches against India and teams touring India beginning next year. Shafiq Stanikzai, Chief Executive of ACB, said the draft had been presented to BCCI president Anurag Thakur in May and further discussions had happened during the ICC Annual Conference in Edinburgh in June 2016.

On 22 June 2017, Afghanistan was granted Test nation status by the ICC. This was the first time in history that two teams earned test status at the same time. Afghanistan share this honour with Ireland, thus bringing the number of total number of test playing nations to twelve. On 14 June 2018, they played their first test match against India, which they lost within two days.

Domestic competitions
Afghanistan's domestic structure consists of a 25-over Inter-Provincial Tournament, which has the participation of 22 provinces in the tournament. The aim of the tournament is to spread the game across the country and to generate a greater depth of talent for the national team to select from. The best players from the tournament would be selected players for Afghanistan-A and under-19 teams based on their performance and would be sent for training and coaching to Bangladesh. Afghanistan teams often visit Pakistan. Currently Afghanistan A team is visiting Pakistan.

Two teams from the 12-team first round will advance to the next round. The top six from the tournament will then contest Afghanistan's main domestic event - a 50 over tournament in Kabul in May 2010. The 50 over tournament was won by Kabul Province.

Starting in 2011, Afghanistan's domestic cricket structure has grown. The expanded Inter-Provincial Tournament was reorganized into a 50 over tournament and divided into a Challenge Cup section (the Etisalat ODN Challenge Cup with 20 provincial teams) and an Elite Cup section (with 12 provincial teams; 4 of them qualifiers from the Challenge Cup section). In addition to the Inter-Provincial cricket the Afghanistan Cricket Board (ACB) has divided the provinces of Afghanistan in to 5 Cricket Regions to enable the better management of the game. The Regions are Amo in the north (centered on Balkh), Spin Ghar in the east (centered on Nangarhar), Band-e-Amir in the centre (centered on Kabul), Mis Ainak in the southeast (centered on Khost), and Boost in the west and southwest (centered on Kandahar). The 5 regions in turn have representative teams which play in all traditional 3 formats of cricket; the Ahmad Shah Abdali One-Day Tournament, Ahmad Shah Abdali T20 Tournament and Ahmad Shah Abdali Three-Day Tournament.

In addition to an expansion of the inter-provincial tournament from 25-over matches to 50-over matches and the addition of the T-20 and multi-day formats, cricket in Afghanistan has now expanded across the provinces as well; 32 of the 34 provinces now have representatives sides All provinces except Daykundi and Farah have a representative team, while the ACB recognizes Afghan Refugees and Kochain as provincial teams. There are also plans to expand the three-day league competition into a four-day league in 2014.

The UAE-based telecommunications company, Etisalat is now one of the main sponsors of Afghanistan's cricket, including being the then title sponsor in Afghanistan's division 2 inter-provincinal challenge cup and the Etisalat Sixes T20 Tournament. Which is now sponsored by Afghan company called "Alokozay" Shpageeza Cricket League.

Domestic teams

Regional domestic teams

 Region: Amo
Balkh Province
Faryab Province
Jowzjan Province
Samangan Province
Sar-e Pol Province
 Region: Band-e-Amir
Ghazni Province
Bamyan Province
Daykundi Province
Maidan Wardak Province
 Region: Boost
Kandahar Province
Helmand Province
Nimruz Province
Uruzgan Province
Zabul Province
 Region: Hindukush
Herat Province
Badghis Province
Farah Province
Ghor Province
 Region: Mis Ainak
Khost Province
Logar Province
Paktia Province
Paktika Province
 Region: Pamir
Kunduz Province
Badakhshan Province
Baghlan Province
Panjshir Province
Parwan Province
Takhar Province
 Region: Spin Ghar
Nangarhar Province
Kapisa Province
Kunar Province
Laghman Province
Nuristan Province
 Region: Kabul

Cricket grounds in Afghanistan

The Afghan national cricket team does not play its home matches inside Afghanistan due to the ongoing security situation and the lack of international standard facilities. Afghanistan played their 'home' Intercontinental Cup fixture against Ireland at the Rangiri Dambulla International Stadium in Sri Lanka. Following Afghanistan's World Twenty20 qualifying campaign they played two One-Day Internationals against Canada at the Sharjah Cricket Association Stadium in the UAE, after which the stadium was named the 'home' ground of Afghanistan.

Work on the Sherzai Cricket Stadium in Jalalabad, a city known in Afghanistan for being the 'capital of cricket', is in progress. Construction has also begun on the Kabul National Cricket Stadium and the Kandahar International Cricket Stadium in the south of the country.  The President of the Afghanistan Cricket Board, Omar Zakhilwal, announced in October 2010 that the government was planning to construct standard cricket grounds in all 34 provinces in the next two years.

The following are the most important cricket stadiums in Afghanistan:

Ghazi Amanullah International Cricket Stadium in Ghazi Amanullah Town, Jalalabad
Kandahar International Cricket Stadium in Kandahar (under construction)
Kabul National Cricket Stadium in Kabul 
Balkh Cricket Stadium in Mazar-i-Sharif
Khost Cricket Stadium in Khost
Sherzai Cricket Stadium in Jalalabad (under construction)
Kunduz Cricket Stadium in Kunduz

Other Home grounds for Afghanistan
In January 2021, Afghanistan Cricket Board made announcement of exploring the possibility of using Oman as a new 'home' venue for international cricket matches.

National team

The Afghanistan national cricket team represents the country of Afghanistan in international cricket matches. The national team was formed in 2001, which played in the 2009 World Cup Qualifier after rising rapidly through the World Cricket League, starting in Division Five in May 2008. They play in the Elite division of the ACC Trophy.

Afghanistan's 21-run win over Namibia in Krugersdorp earned them official One Day International status. Afghanistan won their first One Day International against Scotland. In 2011, the team qualified for the 2012 ICC Under-19 Cricket World Cup.

Afghanistan played its first 50 over World Cup in 2015. It played 6 matches in all and won 1 match (against Scotland) and losing the rest. Afghanistan has played in 3 T20 World Cups, 2010, 2012 and 2014. They also qualified for ICC World T20-2016.

In December 2015, Afghanistan hired the services of Manoj Prabhakar, the former Indian all rounder as their bowling coach.

The Afghanistan Cricket Board also maintained a women's national cricket team which was first organized in 2010. The team became inactive following the Taliban takeover of Kabul in August 2021.

See also

 Cricket in Afghanistan
 Out of the Ashes, a documentary of the Afghanistan national cricket team's qualification for the 2010 ICC World Twenty20 tournament

References

External links
Official site
Afghanistan Cricket (unofficial)
Afghanistan on ESPN Cricinfo
Afghanistan on asiancricket.org

Cricket administration
Cricket administration in Afghanistan
Cricket
Sports organizations established in 1995
1995 establishments in Afghanistan
Cricket in Asia
Sport in Afghanistan
Afghanistan Cricket Board